Theo Cowan (born Bristol, England) is a British actor. After graduating from Guildhall School of Music and Drama in 2014 Theo has performed in various television and theatre productions including Primetime at The Royal Court Theatre, Headlong (theatre company)'s production of The Absence of War directed by Jeremy Herrin, Lucy Bailey's Comus at Shakespeare's Globe and has completed filming the BBC adaptation of The Outcast written and adapted for screen by Sadie Jones.

Before training Theo appeared in theatre shows including two plays at the Bristol Old Vic, the role of Henry in Lord of the Flies at Open Air Theatre, Regent's Park and on screen as the semi-regular character Steven O'Connell in the BBC series Doctors.

References

External links
 
 Gsmd.ac.uk
 
 
 
 
 

Living people
British male television actors
British male stage actors
Year of birth missing (living people)